The local elections were held in a common date (6 December 1952) for all six municipal and town councils in the Federation of Malaya.

Municipal election

George Town

Kuala Lumpur

Malacca

Town councils election

Bandar Maharani, Muar

Bandar Penggaram, Batu Pahat

Johore Bahru

Local councils election

Gelang Patah

Kedah

Pasir Pinji New Village
The Pasir Pinji New Village local council election is the first election to be held in Perak in December 1952.

References

1952
1952 elections in Malaya
1952 elections in Asia